The Baodun culture (2700 BC – 1700 BC) was a Neolithic culture centered on the Chengdu Plain in Sichuan, China.

Dates
Archaeologists have divided the culture into four phases (I-IV). The only radiocarbon dates for the Baodun Culture come from Bianduishan. Two dates were calibrated using CalPal software to 2467 ± 347 BC and 1993 ± 335 BC.

Sites
Ten settlements from the culture have been found. The first six sites discovered were: the type site at Baodun in Xinjin County, the site at Mangcheng in Dujiangyan City, the site at Yufu in Wenjiang County, the site at Zizhu in Chongzhou, the site at Shuanghe in Chongzhou, and the site at Gucheng in Pi County. Yufucun is the second largest site associated with the Baodun culture. 

All of the settlements straddle the Min River. The settlement walls were covered with pebbles, a feature unique to the Baodun culture. The pottery from the culture share some similarities with Sanxingdui. The inhabitants lived in wattle and daub houses. The earliest evidence for rice and foxtail millet agriculture in southwest China was discovered at the type site at Baodun.

The majority of buildings were made from wattle and daub technology. The sites at Zizhu and Shuanghe are also surrounded by double walls.

Baodun
The Baodun type site was discovered in 1950. The type site is the oldest and largest site associated with the Baodun culture. This culture has the largest walled Neolithic area in China. Estimates of the labour required to build both walls suggest that they would have taken 100 people over 5 years to build. It is unclear whether the area between the two walls was residential, agricultural, or used for different purposes.

Agriculture
Rice and foxtail millet were both grown at Baodun, with rice dominating. Many weeds associated with paddy rice cultivation were also discovered at Baodun. The remains of Job's tears, Vicia, two types of Vigna, beefsteak plant, and Crataegus were also discovered at Baodun.

Rice has also been found at Mangcheng.

See also
 List of Neolithic cultures of China
 Jinsha
 Sanxingdui
 Three Sovereigns and Five Emperors
 Xia dynasty

Notes

References

 Allan, Sarah (ed), The Formation of Chinese Civilization: An Archaeological Perspective, 
 
 
 
 

Neolithic cultures of China
3rd-millennium BC establishments in China
History of Sichuan